Zvonimir Pospišil (1904-1941) was a Yugoslav revolutionary of Croatian origin, known as one of the main Ustaše terrorists who organised the assassination of King Alexander of Yugoslavia in 1934.

Early Life 
Pospišil was born on 9 June 1904 in Vukovina, Austria-Hungary (modern-day Croatia) to Ladislav and Marija Kralj and was educated as a mechanic.

Before World War II
On 22 March 1929 Pospišil and Mijo Babić murdered Toni Šlegel, the chief editor of newspaper Novosti from Zagreb and president of Jugoštampa, which was the beginning of the terrorist actions of Ustaše.

Pospišil was also one of the conspirators of the assassination of Alexander I of Yugoslavia.

Death
On 17 June 1941 during the battle in Pržine in the June 1941 uprising in eastern Herzegovina, Pospišil was killed in a battle between 600 Ustaše and rebels which lasted for two hours. Ustaše retreated toward Gacko and Avtovac and burned the village of Zborna Gomila, after four died on the battlefield including Zvonimir Pospišil.

During the uprising in eastern Herzegovina the other two conspirators of the assassination of King Alexander, Mijo Babić and Antun Pogorelac, were also killed during their attacks on rebels.

References

Sources 

 
 
 
 

1904 births
1941 deaths
People from Velika Gorica
People from the Kingdom of Croatia-Slavonia
Ustaše
Croatian people of World War II